is a popular song written by lyricist Yū Aku and composer Yasunori Nakamura, and originally recorded and released by idol Junko Sakurada.

The single was released on August 25, 1973 and became one of Junko's signature songs, as well as a standard in the Japanese songbook. The single sold over 150,000 copies and earned Junko the Best Newcomer award at the 15th edition of the Japan Record Award.

The song was originally released on Junko's "Watashi No Aoi Tori" album released in September 1973, but has subsequently been released on several best of and greatest hits compilations, as well as Shōwa and Kayōkyoku compilations.

Track listing (7" Vinyl)

Chart positions

Covers
 Akiko Isozaki covered the song in 1989 for the album "Cuties In Variation".
 D&D covered the song for the 1997 Yu Aku tribute album "VELFARRE J-POP NIGHT presents DANCE with YOU".
 Morning Musume covered the album for their 2008 Yu Aku tribute album Cover You.
 °C-ute member Airi Suzuki covered the song for her performance as Junko Sakurada in the movie "Yu Aku Monogatari".

References

External links
 "Lyrics Romanised and translation of the lyrics.

1973 singles
Songs with lyrics by Yū Aku
1973 songs